Brāhmanahatya (also known as Brahma Hatya) is the Sanskrit term for "the act of killing a Brahmin".
A brahmin who is learned is considered an embodiment of the knowledge he possesses; killing such a person is tantamount to destroying knowledge—- the greatest sin a being can ever commit.

Legend 
In a story involving Indra and Vritra, Brāhmahatya is portrayed as a hideous crime. The killer and his/her descendants thereafter bear a curse. It is not limited to the killing of a Brahmin but extends to the harming or killing of all those creatures that may be considered sacred and equivalent to a Brahmin.

Hindu scriptures prescribe japa, tapa, homa, yagya, tarpan, shradh kriya and Brahma dosha nivarana pooja as means to get rid of the curse. Triambaka pooja at Triyambakeshwara and pinda daan at Gaya are also suggested.

The Tiruvidaimaruthur Shiva temple has an idol for Brahmahatya and the legend of this temple is associated with the curse.

The pandavas committed brahmanahatya after killing their guru Dronacharya, which they repented after praying to lord shiva in the kedarnath temple.

See also
 Kapal Mochan
 Vivekachudamani

References

Hindu law